Innocent Lies is a 1995 thriller film directed by Patrick Dewolf and starring Stephen Dorff, Gabrielle Anwar, Adrian Dunbar and Joanna Lumley. It is a loose adaptation of the 1944 Agatha Christie novel Towards Zero. Keira Knightley, appearing in her film debut, had an early role playing the younger version of Celia Graves, the character portrayed by Anwar.

Synopsis
A British policeman travels to France in 1938, to investigate the death of one of his colleagues. He becomes interested by a family of wealthy Britons who live in luxury in a French coastal resort, and who were heavily involved with the dead man. He soon uncovers a number of dark secrets which the family has tried to conceal.

Cast

In addition, Keira Knightley portrays a young Celia, while brothers Robin and Tobias Saunders appear as Celia's brothers.

References

External links

1995 films
1990s English-language films
Films based on British novels
Films based on works by Agatha Christie
1990s French-language films
Incest in film
1990s thriller films
PolyGram Filmed Entertainment films
Cockfighting in film
1995 multilingual films
British multilingual films
French multilingual films